Hudson is a city in Angelina County, Texas, United States. The population was 4,849 at the 2020 census.

Geography

Hudson is located in central Angelina County at  (31.330062, –94.797360), adjacent to the western border of Lufkin, the county seat. Texas State Highway 94 passes through the community, leading southwest  to Groveton.

Demographics

As of the 2020 United States census, there were 4,849 people, 2,067 households, and 1,381 families residing in the city.

As of the census of 2000, there were 3,792 people, 1,288 households, and 1,013 families residing in the city. The population density was 827.9 people per square mile (319.7/km2). There were 1,390 housing units at an average density of 303.5/sq mi (117.2/km2). The racial makeup of the city was 83.91% White, 3.96% African American, 0.21% Native American, 0.29% Asian, 9.81% from other races, and 1.82% from two or more races. Hispanic or Latino of any race were 17.06% of the population.

There were 1,288 households, out of which 44.2% had children under the age of 18 living with them, 59.6% were married couples living together, 12.9% had a female householder with no husband present, and 21.3% were non-families. 17.8% of all households were made up of individuals, and 6.2% had someone living alone who was 65 years of age or older. The average household size was 2.94 and the average family size was 3.30.

In the city, the population was spread out, with 31.3% under the age of 18, 10.5% from 18 to 24, 30.7% from 25 to 44, 20.0% from 45 to 64, and 7.5% who were 65 years of age or older. The median age was 30 years. For every 100 females, there were 99.8 males. For every 100 females age 18 and over, there were 95.5 males.

The median income for a household in the city was $33,511, and the median income for a family was $37,292. Males had a median income of $26,935 versus $19,722 for females. The per capita income for the city was $13,798. About 12.1% of families and 13.3% of the population were below the poverty line, including 16.7% of those under age 18 and 15.5% of those age 65 or over.

Hudson has no post office. All mail sent to residents who live in Hudson can use Hudson, Texas or Lufkin, Texas address, since they share a zip code.

Police services
City of Hudson Police Department was formed in 2001. The Department Operates with a Staff of 4 Officers.

Education
Hudson is served by the Hudson Independent School District.

References

External links
  Handbook of Texas Online article
 Hudson Independent School District
 Hudson Volunteer Fire Department

Cities in Angelina County, Texas
Cities in Texas